South Molton Hundred was the name of one of thirty two ancient administrative units of Devon, England.

The parishes in the hundred were:
East Anstey,
Bishop's Tawton,
Chittlehampton,
George Nympton,
Knowstone,
Landkey,
Molland,
North Molton,
Satterleigh,
South Molton,
Swimbridge,
Twitchen,
Warkleigh and
West Anstey.

See also 
 List of hundreds of England and Wales - Devon

References 

Hundreds of Devon